Llŷr Huws Gruffydd, (born 25 September 1970) is a Welsh Plaid Cymru politician, serving as a Member of the Senedd (MS) for the North Wales region since 2011.

Background
Gruffydd attended Bro Myrddin Welsh Comprehensive School and Aberystwyth University where he graduated with a BA degree in Welsh. He started his career as a youth worker, becoming Senior Development Officer with the Wales Youth Agency and the chief officer for the Council for Wales of Voluntary Youth Services.

He was elected to Carmarthen Town Council in 1995 and was mayor in 2001–02.

He lives near Ruthin in Denbighshire and, until his election as AM, worked as the Wales Communications Officer for the National Trust. He was previously a manager with the economic development company, Menter a Busnes.

Politics
From 1999 to 2003 Gruffydd worked as a researcher and press officer for Plaid's Members of the European Parliament, Jill Evans MEP and Eurig Wyn MEP. He was also national campaign co-ordinator for Dafydd Wigley, in the run-up to the 1999 National Assembly elections, at which time Wigley was president of Plaid Cymru.

He was Plaid Cymru's Senedd candidate for Carmarthen West & South Pembrokeshire in 2003 when he came within 400 votes of taking the seat from Christine Gwyther.
After moving back to Denbighshire in 2004, Gruffydd was the 2010 Westminster Election candidate for Clwyd West, increasing the party's vote by over 50% and securing the second biggest swing to Plaid in the country.

In the 2011 Senedd election, he was returned as one of the four members of the Senedd for the North Wales region, being the first placed candidate on the Plaid Cymru list.

He is currently the party's Shadow Minister for the Environment and Rural Affairs and is Chair of the National Assembly's Finance Committee.

References

External links
Llyr Huws Gruffydd, profile at the site of Plaid Cymru official site

Offices held

1970 births
Living people
Plaid Cymru members of the Senedd
Wales AMs 2011–2016
Wales MSs 2021–2026
People from Ruthin
Welsh-speaking politicians
Welsh republicans